Dulkadiroğlu is a planned district and second level municipality in Kahramanmaraş Province, Turkey. According to Law act no 6360, all Turkish provinces with a population more than 750000, will be a metropolitan municipality and the districts within the metropolitan municipalities will be second level municipalities. The law also creates new districts within the provinces in addition to present districts. These changes will be effective by the local elections in 2014.

Thus after 2014 the present Kahramanmaraş central district will be split into two. A part will be named Dulkadiroğlu and the name Kahramanmaraş will be reserved for the metropolitan municipality. "Dulkadiroğlu means "son of Dulkadir" and Dulkadir was a Turkmen tribe leader who had founded a beylik (principality) in and around Kahramanmaraş in the 15th century.

Rural area
There will be one town and 57 villages in the rural area of Dulkadiroğlu district. Now their official status became "neighborhood of Dulkadiroğlu".

References

Kahramanmaraş
Districts of Kahramanmaraş Province